Nogometni klub Šampion, commonly referred to as NK Šampion or simply Šampion, is a Slovenian football club which plays in the city of Celje. They play in the Slovenian Third League, the third highest football league in Slovenia. The club was founded in 1995.

Honours

Styrian League (fourth tier)
 Winners: 2007–08

Slovenian Fifth Division
 Winners: 2004–05

MNZ Celje Cup
 Winners: 2014–15, 2016–17

League history

References

External links
Official website 

Association football clubs established in 1995
Football clubs in Slovenia
Sport in Celje
1995 establishments in Slovenia